Kaira was a town of ancient Lydia. Its name does not occur among ancient authors, but is inferred from epigraphic and other evidence.

Its site is located near Gökçen in Asiatic Turkey.

References

Populated places in ancient Lydia
Former populated places in Turkey
History of İzmir Province